State Route 9B (SR 9B) is a short state highway in southern Maine.  It begins in the west at an intersection with SR 9, serving as a  southern spur of the highway, to U.S. Route 1 (US 1) near Wells Beach.  The route is located entirely within Wells.

Route description

SR 9B begins west of town, where SR 9 begins to turn to the northeast.  It runs eastward, intersecting local roads as it heads towards the coastline.  SR 9B crosses under the Maine Turnpike without an interchange (the nearest entrance is at Exit 19, accessible from SR 9/SR 109).  SR 9B continues eastward until it intersects and ends at US 1.

History
SR 9B used to be co-signed with US 1 from Charles Chase Corner (its current terminus) north to US 1's intersection with SR 9 in Wells, connecting SR 9B to its parent at both ends and making it a loop.  However, in 1955 the concurrency was removed, truncating SR 9B to its current terminus and reducing it to a spur.

Major intersections

References

009B
Wells, Maine
Transportation in York County, Maine